William Peter Rabon (born July 6, 1951) is a Republican member of the North Carolina State Senate, and a veterinarian.  He is the Chairman of the Rules and Operations of the Senate committee, the Select Committee on Nominations, and the Finance Committee.

Rabon has degrees from North Carolina State University and the University of Georgia.

References

North Carolina General Assembly bio of Rabon

Living people
Republican Party North Carolina state senators
North Carolina State University alumni
University of Georgia alumni
1951 births
21st-century American politicians